Lawrence Mel Brooks (born February 26, 1950, in New York City) is an American hockey journalist for the New York Post, covering the New York Rangers in the National Hockey League. He served as president of the Professional Hockey Writers' Association from 2001 to 2003. He was awarded the Elmer Ferguson Memorial Award from the Hockey Hall of Fame in 2018.

From 1982 until 1992, he was a senior Vice President with the New Jersey Devils organization.

References

American male journalists
1950 births
Date of birth missing (living people)
Elmer Ferguson Award winners
Living people